North Sydney was an electoral district of the Legislative Assembly in the Australian state of New South Wales. Created in 1927, it replaced part of the multi-member electorate of North Shore, and was  named after and included the Sydney suburb of North Sydney.  It was abolished in 1962 and partly replaced by Kirribilli.

Members for North Sydney

Election results

References

Former electoral districts of New South Wales
1927 establishments in Australia
Constituencies established in 1927

1962 disestablishments in Australia
Constituencies disestablished in 1962